The Eagle's Talons is a 1923 American film serial directed by Duke Worne. The film is considered to be lost.

Cast
 Fred Thomson - Jack Alden
 Ann Little - Enid Markham
 Al Wilson - Charles Dean
 Herbert Fortier - Gregory Markham
 Joseph W. Girard - Burton Thorne
 Edith Stayart - Helen Thorne
 Edward Cecil - Judson Steele
 Roy Tompkins - Cinders
 Joe Bonomo - Thorne's henchman
 Albert J. Smith - Thorne's henchman
 George Magrill - Thorne's henchman
 Tom Tyler - Extra (uncredited) (unconfirmed)

See also
 List of film serials
 List of film serials by studio

References

External links

1923 films
1920s action films
1923 lost films
American silent serial films
American black-and-white films
Films directed by Duke Worne
Lost American films
Lost action films
Universal Pictures film serials
1920s American films
Silent action films